Cynthia A. "Mother" Pratt (born 5 November 1945) is the former Deputy Prime Minister of the Bahamas. She attained the office when the Progressive Liberal Party came to power in the national elections of 2002.

She is  a Protestant minister and served as a Physical Education teacher in the Bahamian public school system. She served as acting Prime Minister in 2005 when PM Perry Christie suffered a stroke.

She was re-elected to her seat in Parliament in the 2007 general election.

On Friday, 10 November 2017, she launched her biography, An Ordinary Woman from the Heart of the Inner City, published by Scholar Books. Publisher Albert Cox reported at the launch that 35,000 copies had been sold already. Vernon Lynch, brother of actor Eddie Murphy, confirmed he will make Mrs Pratt's book into a movie.

On 1 August 2022, she was sworn in as the deputy to the Governor-General of the Bahamas.

References

External links 
Women Premier Ministers. Worldwide Guide to Women in Leadership.

1945 births
21st-century Bahamian women politicians
21st-century Bahamian politicians
Bahamian Protestants
Deputy Prime Ministers of the Bahamas
Female defence ministers
Defence ministers of the Bahamas
Living people
Members of the House of Assembly of the Bahamas
People from New Providence
Progressive Liberal Party politicians
Women prime ministers
Women government ministers of the Bahamas